The Eagles Wing Scout is an American powered parachute that was designed and produced by Eagles Wing Corporation of Normandy, Tennessee. Now out of production, when it was available the aircraft was supplied as a complete ready-to-fly aircraft.

The aircraft was introduced in 1999 and production ended when the company went out of business in 2005.

Design and development
It features a  parachute-style wing, single-place accommodation, tricycle landing gear and a single  Zenoah G-50 engine in pusher configuration.

The aircraft carriage is built from a combination of bolted aluminium and 4130 steel tubing. Inflight steering is accomplished via foot pedals that actuate the canopy brakes, creating roll and yaw. On the ground the aircraft has lever-controlled nosewheel steering. The main landing gear incorporates spring rod suspension.

Specifications (Scout)

References

Scout
1990s United States sport aircraft
1990s United States ultralight aircraft
Single-engined pusher aircraft
Powered parachutes